David Grisman (born March 23, 1945) is an American mandolinist. His music combines bluegrass, folk, and jazz in a genre he calls "Dawg music". He founded the record label Acoustic Disc, which issues his recordings and those of other acoustic musicians.

Biography
Grisman grew up in a Conservative Jewish household in Passaic, New Jersey. His father was a professional trombonist who gave him piano lessons when he was seven years old. As a teenager, he played piano, mandolin, and saxophone.

In the early 1960s, he attended New York University. He belonged to the Even Dozen Jug Band with Maria Muldaur and John Sebastian. He played in the bluegrass band the Kentuckians led by Red Allen, then in the psychedelic rock band Earth Opera with Peter Rowan. He moved to San Francisco, met Jerry Garcia, and appeared on the Grateful Dead album American Beauty. He played in Garcia's bluegrass band Old & In the Way with Peter Rowan and Vassar Clements. When Grisman was 17 years old, he was invited on stage by Doc Watson to join him on mandolin for a rendition of “In the Pines”.

Garcia named him "Dawg" after a dog that was following him while they were driving in Stinson Beach, California.
"Dawg Music" is what Grisman calls his mixture of bluegrass and Django Reinhardt/Stéphane Grappelli-influenced jazz as highlighted on his album Hot Dawg (recorded Oct. 1978, released 1979). It was Grisman's combination of Reinhardt-era jazz, bluegrass, folk, Old World Mediterranean string band music, as well as modern jazz fusion that came to embody "Dawg" music.

In the 1970s, he started the David Grisman Quintet with Darol Anger, Joe Carroll, Todd Phillips, and Tony Rice. They released their eponymous first album in 1977 for Kaleidoscope Records and their second, Hot Dawg, two years later for Horizon Records, the jazz division of A&M Records. When the quintet recorded for Warner Bros. Records, the membership changed to include Mike Marshall, Mark O'Connor, and Rob Wasserman, with occasional guest appearances by jazz violinist Stéphane Grappelli.

In the 1980s, Grisman formed the record label Acoustic Disc, which issued his recordings and those by other acoustic musicians. The folk and bluegrass part of his personality emerged when he recorded with Mark O'Connor, Tony Rice, and Andy Statman.

Family
Grisman is married to Tracy Bigelow and was married twice before. He has three grown children: Samson, Gillian, and Monroe. Samson, a bassist and recording session musician living in Portland, often performs with his father. Gillian, a filmmaker living in Novato, California, directed Grateful Dawg and the music documentary, Village Music: Last of the Great Record Stores.

Monroe Grisman, named for bluegrass music pioneer Bill Monroe, lives in Fairfax, California, and plays in the Tom Petty tribute band Petty Theft.

In media

Grisman's song "Dawggy Mountain Breakdown" was the opening theme song for Car Talk on NPR.

Grisman sued YouTube in May 2007, asserting in federal court that YouTube should be required to prevent individuals from illegally uploading recordings of his music. Grisman's attorneys requested voluntary dismissal of the suit.

The documentary Grateful Dawg (October 14, 2001) chronicles the friendship between Jerry Garcia and David Grisman.

Grisman was a judge for the 6th and 7th annual Independent Music Awards to support independent artists.

He wrote much of the bluegrass music for the 1974 film Big Bad Mama directed by Roger Corman. It was played by the Great American Music Band, and they were recorded and mixed by Bill Wolf.

Discography

Acoustic Disc

Acoustic Disc is an independent record label founded by Grisman in 1990. The label is based in San Rafael, California, and specializes in bluegrass, folk, jazz, and Dawg music.

References

External links
Dawg.net Dave Grisman/Acoustic Disc official website
David Grisman at The Music Box Collection of reviews
David Grisman discography at the Grateful Dead Family Discography

1945 births
Living people
Jewish American musicians
Jewish singers
People from Hackensack, New Jersey
Singers from New Jersey
American jazz musicians
American bluegrass musicians
American mandolinists
American session musicians
Jerry Garcia
American bluegrass mandolinists
Even Dozen Jug Band members
David Grisman Quintet members
Earth Opera members
Muleskinner (band) members
Old & In the Way members